Tug of War is a 2006 short film by British film director Scott Mann. The film was a co-production between Bigger Picture Productions and Shakabuku Films with the assistance of Granada Film and was Mann's directorial debut. Completion funding was provided by the UK Film Council.

Synopsis
Four college friends enter into a bet to see who can go the longest without 'self-love'. Tug of War follows their trials and tribulations as they try to last ten torturous days.

Cast 
Scott Neal
Marsha Thomason
Julie Goodyear
Jo Guest
Martin Hancock
Zoe McConnell

External links
 

2006 comedy films
2006 short films
2006 films
Masturbation in fiction
British comedy short films